Dennis K.J. Lin is a Taiwanese-American statistician, who works in the areas of design of experiments, quality assurance, data mining, and data science.

Education and early life
He was born in Taiwan, ROC, and obtained a bachelor's degree (in mathematics) in June 1981 from National Tsing-Hua University, ROC. He received a Ph.D. (in statistics) in December 1988 from the University of Wisconsin-Madison, with a minor in computer science.

Career and research
From 1995 to 2020, Lin worked as a statistician for Pennsylvania State University, and became a university distinguished professor. Since July 2020, he has been the head at the department of statistics at Purdue University.

Lin published a total of over 200 papers in professional journals.

Lin is known for his contributions to the design of experiments, industrial statistics and Ghost Data.

Professional fellowships
Elected Fellow, Institute of Mathematical Statistics (2013)
Elected Fellow, American Society for Quality (2006)
Elected Fellow, American Statistical Association (1998)
Elected Member, International Statistical Institute (1994)
(Elected) Fellow, Royal Statistical Society (1988)

See also
Quality assurance
Design of experiments

References

Living people
University of Wisconsin–Madison College of Letters and Science alumni
National Tsing Hua University alumni
Taiwanese statisticians
Purdue University faculty
Taiwanese emigrants to the United States
Pennsylvania State University faculty
Year of birth missing (living people)